Lieutenant Colonel Walter Chiles (died 1653) was a Virginia politician and merchant. He moved to Virginia around 1638, and served as a burgess on and off from 1642 to 1653, representing Charles City County and later James City County. He also served on the Governor's council in 1651, but was removed the following year because of his involvement in illegal trading with the Netherlands. He was elected Speaker of the Virginia House of Burgesses at the July 1653 session, but the governor forced his resignation the following day.

Walter Chiles's son, Walter Chiles II, married Mary Page, daughter of Col. John Page, a merchant and member of the Virginia House of Burgesses.

Notes

References

1653 deaths
American merchants
English emigrants
People from Jamestown, Virginia
Speakers of the Virginia House of Burgesses
Virginia Governor's Council members
Year of birth unknown